Wild Animals is the third album by The Pinker Tones, released in 2008. It also collaborate artists such as Amparo from Amparanoia and Jimmy Lindsay from Cymande.

Track listing
All tracks written by The Pinker Tones.

Usage in Media
 Their song, "The Whistling Song" used in the soundtrack of 2008 film Beverly Hills Chihuahua, Ping Pong Playa and EA Sports video game, FIFA 09.
 Also "Electrotumbao" was featured in EA racing video game, NFS: Undercover and Tony Hawk: Ride.
 It also appeared in 2009 movie XIII edición de los 'Premios de la música' with Sexy Robot vs 24.

2008 albums
The Pinker Tones albums